The Waldeisenbahn Muskau is a  narrow gauge railway connecting Kromlau, Weißwasser and Bad Muskau in Saxony, Germany.

History

The first tracks were laid in 1895. Operation began as a horse-drawn railway, with the switch to steam locomotives beginning in 1896.

Tracks and rolling stock were damaged in the Second World War, after which reparations further restricted the operation of the Waldeisenbahn Muskau.

In 1951 the Waldeisenbahn was incorporated into the Reichsbahn. On March 21, 1978 the Minister of Transport ordered the closure of the Waldeisenbahn Muskau, which was followed by an order on March 29 to cease operation by the Cottbus railway directorate.

After 1978 only  of track remained in use between Weißwasser and a brickyard, with occasional special services run by rail enthusiasts. First efforts to preserve the Waldeisenbahn Muskau were made by rail enthusiasts beginning in the 1980s. A construction staff was established by the district of Weißwasser in 1991. The line between Weißwasser and Kromlau reopened in 1992, with tourist services beginning the same year. The line to Bad Muskau was reopened in 1995.

Operations on the  ceased in 2014 due to the expansion of the  open pit mine. A new  alignment of the Tonbahn was inaugurated in April 2017, with the former alignment being dismantled to make way for the open pit mine. The new terminus is located near the Schwerer Berg observation tower.

A new maintenance workshop was inaugurated in 2019, eliminating the need to transport the locomotives to maintenance companies with lowboy trailers.

Network
Most of the tracks were removed following the closure of the network in 1978. , it has 12 stations and three stops.

Rolling stock
Until its closure in 1978, the Waldeisenbahn was only operated as an industrial railway, with the fleet consisting of multiple steam locomotives, diesel locomotives for shunting, and over 550 railway cars in total. Some of the original rolling stock is still used for heritage operation. Other rolling stock has been acquired from pit railways and  systems. The current fleet consists of steam locomotives, 31 diesel locomotives, passenger cars and freight cars.

References

Further reading

External links

 

Transport in Saxony
600 mm gauge railways in Germany
Heritage railways in Germany